Khalifah Mubarak (Arabic: خليفة مبارك) (born 30 October 1993) is an Emirati footballer who currently plays as a defender for Khor Fakkan.

External links

References

Emirati footballers
1993 births
Living people
Al-Nasr SC (Dubai) players
Shabab Al-Ahli Club players
Khor Fakkan Sports Club players
Footballers at the 2014 Asian Games
UAE Pro League players
Association football defenders
2019 AFC Asian Cup players
Asian Games competitors for the United Arab Emirates
United Arab Emirates international footballers